The eastcoast lampeye (Pantanodon stuhlmanni)  is a species of fish in the family Poeciliidae. It is endemic to coastal Kenya and Tanzania, where found in brackish water, mangrove swamps, pools, lagoons and river deltas. This fish was described by Ernst Ahl as Haplochilichthys stuhlmanni with the type locality given as Tanganyika Territory. The specific name honours the co-leader of the German East Africa Expedition (1889-1892) on which type was collected, Franz Ludwig Stuhlmann (1863-1928) of the German Colonial Service.

Sources

East Coast lampeye
Fish described in 1924
Taxonomy articles created by Polbot